Bhet is a 2002 Marathi language film co-produced and directed by Chandrakant Kulkarni.

Sudha was married earlier to Bhau but they divorce. She then marries Satish and has young daughter, Manu. Bhau is also married now. Sudha and Bhau have a 12 year old son Ananda who is staying with his grandmother, uncle and aunt in Nagpur. It has been 8 years since she left and he does not remember her clearly. Sudha also remembers him. Ananda wants to meet his mother, and manages to get Sudha's address. He sends a letter to her. She wants to meet Ananda. But such meeting is not going to be easy with opposition by families. They struggle and meet at the end.

Cast 
 Prateeksha Lonkar as Sudha
 Atul Kulkarni
 Shreyas Talpade
 Tushar Dalvi as Satish
 Deepa Shriram Lagoo
 Mohan Joshi
 Vandana Gupte
 Vijay Divan
 Umesh Kamat
 Manjusha Godase
 Kimaya Chaubal
 Pratiksha Khanuilkar
 Priya Bapat (child artist)
Apoorva Koregave (child artist) as Ananda

Soundtrack
The music has been directed by Ashok Patki, while the lyrics were written by Vinayak Rahatekar.

Track listing

Awards
Atul Kulkarni won the Maharashtra State Government Award for Best Actor in Supporting Role.

References

External links 
 Interview - mid-day.com
 Atul Kulkarni Awards - atulkulkarni.com

2002 films
Films directed by Chandrakant Kulkarni
2000s Marathi-language films